Janet Jones is a Canadian artist, art historian and associate professor at York University in Toronto, Ontario.  She is known for her hard-edge abstract painting which draws from technological culture, film history and urban space. Jones merges imagery inspired by sterile public spaces like the lobbies of multinational corporations or hyper-lit passages on the Las Vegas casino strip.

Her 2010 solo exhibition, DaDa Delirium at the MacLaren Art Centre in Barrie, Ontario, showed large abstract paintings made between 2003 and 2010. It was enthusiastically reviewed by Yvonne Lammerich in Canadian Art.

Her Ph.D thesis was "Clement Greenberg and the Artist/Critic Relationship", which focused on Greenbergian modernist criticism in relation to painting and the internal structure of the 'Greenberg Group'.

In 2002 she received the Faculty of Fine Arts Dean's Teaching Award for outstanding teaching and contribution to the life and vibrancy of the Faculty of Fine Arts.

References

External links
Biography and Information about Janet Jones
Profile on Canadian Art
CCCA Artist Profile for Janet Jones
Canadian Art Exhibition Review

1953 births
Living people
Artists from Montreal
Canadian art historians
Canadian women painters
Academic staff of York University
Women art historians
21st-century Canadian women artists
Canadian women historians